Roosevelt Mall is a medium-sized outdoor shopping mall, located along Pennsylvania Route 73 (Cottman Avenue) between Bustleton Avenue west end and U.S. Route 1 (Roosevelt Boulevard) in the east end, or Rhawnhurst neighborhood, of Northeast Philadelphia, Pennsylvania.

The mall has 45 stores and services.  It is currently anchored by a large, three-level Macy's department store on its east end.  Since 2015, the mall has featured a flea market on Saturdays during the summer.

History
Since opening in 1964, Roosevelt Mall anchors have included S. Klein, Wanamaker's, Hecht's, Strawbridge's, and Macy's.  The original anchor, S. Klein, closed in 1975 due to financial problems of its owner, McCrory Stores.  it was replaced by Wanamaker's in 1976 and was converted to Hecht's in 1995 following May Department Stores' acquisition of the Wanamaker's chain.  About a year later, Hecht's became Strawbridge's.  During the Strawbridge's years, it had a bargain basement in which all furniture and goods were marked down by 80%.  Following Federated Department Stores' acquisition of May Department Stores in 2005, Strawbridge's was rebranded as Macy's.

The mall was also home to a location of prominent cheesesteak restaurant chain Jim's Steaks, closed due to health violations in 2017.

Great Northeast Plaza
Located directly across from Roosevelt Mall is Great Northeast Plaza, which was formerly anchored by Sears.  Prior to Sears, it was anchored by Gimbels.

External links

 Facebook page

References

Shopping malls in Pennsylvania
Shopping malls established in 1964
Economy of Philadelphia
Northeast Philadelphia
1964 establishments in Pennsylvania